St. Norbert Senior Secondary School is a private school in Indore, Madhya Pradesh, India. It has been established since July 1, 2001. Its patron is St. Norbert. The school is affiliated to CBSE, New Delhi (Affiliation Number is 1030291) since 2007. It is an English medium school. It has a motto, “Towards a New Society".

The school started with just one building of three floors (including G-floor), 39 students and very few teachers. By 2018, this school has grown to five such buildings, which includes Kids Paradise (a separate building dedicated to small students up to class 3rd), with an attendance of 4,308 students along with 131 qualified teaching and non-teaching staff along with 62 support staff.

The school has 10+2 system of school education, meaning it teaches from Classes Nursery to Twelfth Standard. The facilities available in the school mainly includes Library, Smart Classes, Christian Church, student laboratories (including Physics Lab, Maths Lab, Chemistry Lab, Computer Labs), bus facility, basketball court, and a ground for football. It is a Christian Minority School, for both boys and girls (meaning the school supports coeducation). It is a self-financing school.

References

External links 
 St. Norbert School (Homepage)
 St. Norbert School's Church
 St. Norbert School Details on Aura.Education

Schools in Indore
Co-educational schools in India
Private schools in Madhya Pradesh
Christian schools in Madhya Pradesh
2001 establishments in Madhya Pradesh
Educational institutions established in 2001